Income in kind, or in-kind income, is income other than money income.  It includes many employee benefits and government-provided goods and services, such as toll-free roads, food stamps, public schooling, or socialized medicine.

Types of Income in Kind 
 Free rent in exchange for caretaking duties. 
 Note:  If the caretaker receives a paycheck with an amount for rent deducted, the gross earnings are earned income, not in-kind income.
 Free room and board provided by a friend or relative.
 Free clothing or household goods provided by a community organization.
 Exchange of services, such as babysitting.

See also
 Barter
 Local exchange trading system
 Truck system

References

Employee benefits
Public services